was a Japanese jazz fusion composer, arranger, and keyboardist. He played with The Brecker Brothers and Steve Gadd and released albums for Polydor and Toshiba in the 1970s.

Early life and career
At the age of 3, Fukamachi began to learn  piano. After attending Izumi High School, he began landing production deals. He dropped out of Tokyo National University of Fine Arts and Music just prior to graduating.

In 1971, he signed to Polydor Records for the release of his debut album, A Portrait of a Young Man. Following this, he worked as composer and keyboard player of jazz fusion.

Since the early 1970s he began to use synthesizers to create numerous albums such as Quark (1980), in particular using the Yamaha CS-01 breath controller technique.

In 1989, he was appointed Professor of Scooter Gakuen University Music School and founded Japan's first synthesizer major.

Death
On November 22, 2010, he died of an aortic dissection due to pericardial hematoma.

Discography

As leader
 Piano Solo Best of Beatles (Polydor, 1972)
 Hello (Polydor, 1972)
 Now Sound Christmas (Polydor, 1972)
 Piano Solo Screen Music 10 (Polydor, 1973)
 Rokuyu (Express, 1975)
 Silver Fish (Polydor, 1975)
 Introducing Jun Fukamachi (Toshiba, 1975)
 Spiral Steps (Kitty, 1976)
 Jun Fukamachi at Steinway (Toshiba, 1976)
 Jun Fukamachi at the Steinway (Take 2) (Toshiba, 1976)
 Together with Jun/Martha Miyake (Toshiba, 1976)
 Sgt. Pepper's Lonely Hearts Club Band (Toshiba, 1977)
 Crystal City (Philips, 1977)
 The Sea of Dirac (Kitty, 1977)
 Triangle Session (Kitty, 1977)
 Second Phase (Toshiba, 1977)
 Evening Star (Kitty, 1978)
 Live (Alfa, 1978)
 On the Move (Alfa, 1978)
 Fantastic Suite: A Dream On a Spring Night (Toshiba, 1978)
 Riverside (Alfa, 1979)
 Wonderland (Alfa, 1980)
 Quark (Alfa, 1980)
 Fusion Synthesizer (Express, 1980)
 The Soundtrack Mishione (Columbia, 1980)
 Solo Vol. 1 (Vap, 1983)
 Remember to Remember (Kitty, 1983)
 Yamato Final Synthesizer Fantasy (Columbia, 1983)
 Queen Emeraldus Synthesizer Fantasy (Columbia, 1983)
 Daisy Chain (Climax, 1983)
 Digital Trip Urusei Yatsura (Animex, 1984)
 Yellow Moon (TDK, 1984)
 Jun Fukamachi Meets Takashi Sato (Eastworld, 1986)
 Spiral Steps (Kitty, 1992)
 Variation of Variation (Kosei, 1996) 
 Midnight Dive (J-one, 1998)
 Civilization (J-one, 1999)
 Winter (Network, 2001)
 Autumn (Network, 2001)
 Summer (Network, 2001)
 Spring (Network, 2002)
 Calm (Network, 2002)
 Piano World (GT Music, 2003)
 Marriage (GT Music, 2004)
 Taizo (Finger, 2004)
 Last Nocturne (Universal, 2012)
 Recital at Suntory Hall (Jun Fukamachi, 2017)

As sideman
With Prism
 Nothin' Unusual (TDK, 1985)
 Dreamin (SMS, 1986)
 The Silence of the Motion (SMS, 1987)
 Live Alive Vol. 2 (SMS, 1987)

With others
 Casiopea, Super Flight (Alfa, 1979)
 Benard Ighner, Little Dreamer (Alfa, 1978)
 Tatsuya Nakamura, Locus (Sea Horse, 1984)
 Masayoshi Takanaka, Takanaka (Kitty, 1977)
 Masayoshi Takanaka, An Insatiable High (Kitty, 1977)
 Kyohei Tsutsumi, Hit Machine (Toshiba, 1976)
 Kazumi Watanabe, Mermaid Boulevard (Alfa, 1978)

References

1946 births
2010 deaths
Japanese jazz composers
Japanese jazz keyboardists